Flávio Augusto Rodrigues Marques (born on 12/04/1979, in São Paulo, Brazil) is a Brazilian musician, composer, musical director and arranger. He specialized in flamenco music. He is currently living in Madrid.

Life and career
Flavio has started playing the guitar with his father at the age of 5.

In 1992, he entered in "Groove" (Free Music School), where he studied Popular Brazilian Music and Jazz with Mr. Leyve Miranda for three years.

During the same time, in 1994, he starts to study flamenco guitar in the “Centro Flamenco Pepe de Córdoba” (São Paulo - Brazil), with Fernando de la Rua.

In 1998, he moved to Spain for the first time where he studied with three main flamenco guitar masters: Manolo Sanlúcar, Gerardo Núñez, and Rafael Riqueni.

Since 2000, living in Madrid, he worked with main flamenco artists such as Antonio Canales, Manuel Reyes, Domingo Ortega, Belén Fernández, Rafaela Carrasco, Belén Maya, Concha Jareño, Adela Campallo, Pastora Galván, Rocío Molina, Rubén Olmo, Manuel Liñán, Marco Flores, Maria Juncal, Concha Jareño, Belén Lopez, Alfonso Losa, José Maya (Joselillo Romero), Rafael Estevez, Pitingo, Rafael Jiménez "Falo", Talegón de Córdoba, Agustin Carbonell “Bola”, Lole Montoya (Lole y Manuel), Montse Cortes, Pepe Habichuela, José Jiménez "el Viejín", José Luís Montón, Juan Parrilla, Rubém Dantas, Juan Gomez “Chicuelo”, Jorge Pardo, José Soto "Sorderita", and also with important Brazilian artists as Filó Machado,
Nana Vasconcelos, Carlinhos Antunes, Yamandu Costa, Sizao Machado, Renato Martins, Thiago Espirito Santo, Alex Buck, etc.

He has also been invited to work with several groups and projects in over 40 countries and collaborates with main artists of different styles: Yoshida Brothers (Japan), The Savage Rose (Denmark), Trilok Gurtu (India), and Hossam Ramzy (Egypt).

He was also guitarist, composer and musical director of the Rafael Amargo’s Company (during 5 years), in six different shows ("Amargo", "Poeta en Nueva York", "Intimo", "Enramblao", "D. Q. - Pasajero en Transito…" and "Tiempo Muerto").

Awards
Nominated at the “VIII Max Awards of Scenic Arts” in the categories “Best Original Music” and “Best Musical Director” for the show "Enramblao" of Rafael Amargo's Company (2004).
Finalist of the guitar "Paco de Lucia's Award" - Concurso Nacional de Arte Flamenco (Spain, Cordoba 2007).
“Flamenco Guitar Supervisor” of “Zorro, the Musical”, produced by Isabel Allende and directed by Chris Renshaw, with original music by the Gipsy Kings and John Cameron (premiere in London's West End on 30 June, Garrick Theatre - 2008).
Preview of his new solo album “Anyway” - Brazilian Tour (9 concerts in 8 major cities), within the Internacional Flamenco Festival and “Guitarisimo Series”, sponsored by Instituto Cervantes, and Premiere at 30th Anniversary – Festival Internacional de la Guitarra de Córdoba (Spain), with several international big names as Mark Knopfler, Paco de Lucía, Deep Purple, David Russell, Pepe Romero, Eva “La Yerbabuena”, Duo Assad, Manuel Barrueco, Leo Brouwer, with resounding success with audience and critics (2010).
Winner of 3 Awards at “Festival de Música de Madrid” (FestiMad – Spain, 2011)
“Best Flamenco Artist Award”
“Newcomer Artist Award”
“Guitar Hero’s Audience Award” - “Best Live Performance”

References

External links
 Flavio's Official Website

Flamenco guitarists
Brazilian guitarists
Brazilian male guitarists
1979 births
Living people
Musicians from São Paulo
21st-century guitarists
21st-century male musicians